Ezra Armstrong (born December 15, 1998) is an American professional soccer player who plays as a defender for St. Louis City SC 2 in the MLS Next Pro.

Career
Armstrong signed to Sporting Kansas City's United Soccer League affiliate side Swope Park Rangers from their academy on March 10, 2016.

In 2018, Armstrong joined German 6th-tier side Türkspor Augsburg.

Armstrong signed to Skovshoved IF in the Fall of 2019.

On February 15, 2021, Armstrong returned to the United States, joining USL Championship side Pittsburgh Riverhounds.

On February 7, 2022, Armstrong joined MLS Next Pro side St. Louis City 2 ahead of the league's inaugural season.

Personal
Ezra is the son of former United States international Desmond Armstrong.

References

External links 
 Swope Park Rangers Profile.

1998 births
Living people
American soccer players
Sporting Kansas City II players
Association football defenders
Soccer players from Tennessee
USL Championship players
MLS Next Pro players
Pittsburgh Riverhounds SC players
American expatriate soccer players in Germany
American expatriate sportspeople in Denmark
Expatriate men's footballers in Denmark
American expatriate soccer players
National Premier Soccer League players
Sportspeople from Nashville, Tennessee
People from Gastonia, North Carolina
St. Louis City SC 2 players